Jeqjeq or Jeq Jeq, also rendered as Dzhigdzhig or Jighjigh or Jigjig, may refer to:
 Jeqjeq-e Olya
 Jeqjeq-e Vosta
Jeqjeq-e Pain